Hamdi Marzouki (born 23 January 1977) is a retired Tunisian professional footballer who played as a defender. From 2000 to 2004, he represented Tunisia national football team internationally and played at the 2002 FIFA World Cup in Korea-Japan. Marzouki has also represented Tunisia in the 1993 FIFA U-17 World Championship.

Club career

Club Africain
Marzouki began his professional career with Tunisian Ligue Professionnelle 1 side Club Africain in 2000 and played for the club twice. In 2001, he helped Club Africain to reach the Semi-finals of the African Cup Winners' Cup. Between 2000 and 2002, he appeared in 50 league matches and scored 4 goals.

Stade Tunisien
In 2002, he signed with Stade Tunisien of the Tunisian Ligue Professionnelle 1 and appeared in 57 league matches, scoring 6 goals. With the Tunisian side, he won the Tunisian Coupe de la Ligue Professionnelle in 2002 and Tunisian President's Cup in 2003.

Back to Africain
After his stint with Stade Tunisien from 2002 to 2004, he came back to Club Africain and earned all total 104 caps for the club (including two spells), scoring 7 goals. He has also captained the team in domestic tournaments.

Later career
He also played domestically for clubs like Dibba Al-Fujairah Club of United Arab Emirates, Al-Arabi SC of Kuwait, CS Hammam-Lif, CA Bizertin and Avenir Sportif de Gabès of Tunisia and Salgaocar SC of India.

Dibba Al-Fujairah
His major achievements are winning the UAE First Division League with Emirati giants Dibba Al-Fujairah Club in 2005–06 season and Kuwait Super Cup with Al-Arabi. He played more than 115 games for the side as a defender alongside scoring 18 goals in the league. He was the highest scoring defender for the Fujairah-based side.

Salgaocar
On 7 January 2011, he penned the contract with Indian I-League outfit Salgaocar SC as a foreign recruit under coaching of Karim Bencherifa. However, he have not appeared in any league match for the club. Though it was his last stint in club football and later he retired in 2011.

International career
Marzouki was called up for the national team of Tunisia by then manager Franco Scoglio in 2000. He made his senior international debut in a friendly match against Switzerland on 15 November 2000, which ended as 1–1.

He was a member of the Tunisian national team at the 2002 FIFA World Cup, where they finished at the bottom. He was listed in the World Cup squad by then manager Ammar Souayah but Marzouki was on the bench in all the three group stage matches.

He then played for Tunisia in the 2002 African Cup of Nations. There he played against Zambia and Egypt respectively.

Honours
Club Africain
 CAF Champions League: 1991
Al-Arabi SC
 Kuwait Super Cup: 2008
Dibba Al-Fujairah
 UAE First Division League: 2005–06
Stade Tunisien
 Tunisian Coupe de la Ligue Professionnelle: 2002
 Tunisian President's Cup: 2003

See also
 Tunisia at the FIFA World Cup
 List of Tunisian expatriate footballers
 1993 FIFA U-17 World Championship squads

References

External links

Hamdi Marzouki at Goalzz
Hamdi Marzouki at Sky Sports
EQUIPE-NATIONALE-PENDANT-LA-COUPE-DU-MONDE-2002 at tounsy06.skyrock.mobi

1977 births
Living people
Tunisian footballers
Tunisian expatriate footballers
2002 FIFA World Cup players
Tunisia international footballers
2002 African Cup of Nations players
Stade Tunisien players
Club Africain players
Dibba FC players
Al-Arabi SC (Kuwait) players
CS Hammam-Lif players
CA Bizertin players
Salgaocar FC players
People from Ben Arous Governorate
Association football defenders
Tunisian Ligue Professionnelle 1 players
UAE First Division League players
Expatriate footballers in Kuwait
Tunisian expatriate sportspeople in Kuwait
Expatriate footballers in India
Kuwait Premier League players
I-League players
Tunisian expatriate sportspeople in India